El Morro Valley is a census-designated place (CDP) in Cibola County, New Mexico, United States. It includes El Morro National Monument and the unincorporated community of El Morro. The area was first listed as a CDP prior to the 2020 census.

El Morro is named after a nearby sandstone promontory with a pool of water at its base, a desert oasis which the Spanish conquistadors called El Morro (The Headland). The Zuni people call it A'ts'ina (Place of Writings on the Rock). Anglo-Americans called it "Inscription Rock".

El Morro is an artist community and home of the El Morro Area Arts Council, an art gallery, a trading post / coffee shop, cafe, RV park & campgrounds, feed & seed store, consignment store and healing arts center. El Morro is the social hub for a colorful array of artists, homesteaders and individualists who reside in a 1000+ square mile area, from El Malpais National Monument to the east, Ramah to the west, the Zuni Mountains to the north, and Candy Kitchen to the south.

Demographics

References

External links 

 Old School Gallery
 Along The Ancient Way - El Morro Valley Community Website
 Timberlake - Ramah News
 El Morro National Monument - Official National Park Service Website

Census-designated places in Cibola County, New Mexico
Census-designated places in New Mexico